Miss Chinese International Pageant 2001 was held on January 20, 2001 in Hong Kong. At the end of the pageant, Bernice Liu of Vancouver, British Columbia, Canada was crowned the 13th Miss Chinese International. This was the first victory for the Canadian city. Prior to this, Vancouver has never placed higher than 2nd runner up.

Pageant information
The theme to this year's pageant is "The Gathering of Cosmopolitan Treasure, The Brightness of Eastern Pearl" 「名都瑰寶滙聚  東方明珠生輝」.  The Masters of Ceremonies were Carol Cheng and Vincent Kok.  Special performing guests were cantopop singers Alan Tam, Edison Chen, Ding Fei Fei and mandopop singer Elva Hsiao.

Results

Special awards
Miss Friendship: Hsin-Ting Chiang 江欣婷 (Taipei)
Miss Cosmopolitan: Bernice Liu  廖碧兒 (Vancouver)
Miss Internet Goodwill: Mandy Chen 陳育嬬 (Brisbane)
Miss Talent: Bernice Liu  廖碧兒 (Vancouver)

Contestant list

Crossovers
Contestants who previously competed or will be competing at other international beauty pageants:

Miss Universe
 2001:  Taipei, : Hsin-Ting Chiang (representing )

Mandy Chen & Edison Chen scandal

The delegate representing Brisbane, Australia, (20) Mandy Chen 陳育嬬, became entangled in a photo scandal with one of the pageant's performers Edison Chen, when suspected nude pictures of Mandy Chen engaging in sexual acts, along with pictures of other Hong Kong female celebrities surfaced in early 2008.  During the pageant, Edison Chen has stated that Mandy Chen is his favourite delegate. Mandy Chen has yet to comment on the incident.

References

External links
Johnny's Pageant Page - Miss Chinese International Pageant 2001
Official Webpage

TVB
2001 beauty pageants
2001 in Hong Kong
Beauty pageants in Hong Kong
Miss Chinese International Pageants